Max Syring (20 August 1908 – 14 April 1983) was a German long-distance runner who won a bronze medal over 10,000 m  at the 1938 European Championships. He competed at the 1932 Summer Olympics in the 5,000 and 10,000 m events and finished in sixth and fifth place, respectively; he failed to reach the 5,000 m final at the 1936 Summer Olympics. In retirement Syring worked as an athletics coach. His trainees included Klaus Richtzenhain.

References

1908 births
1983 deaths
German male long-distance runners
Olympic athletes of Germany
Athletes (track and field) at the 1932 Summer Olympics
Athletes (track and field) at the 1936 Summer Olympics
European Athletics Championships medalists
20th-century German people